Hans "Specker" Grünberg (8 July 1917 – 16 January 1998) was a German military aviator who served in the Luftwaffe during World War II. As a fighter ace, he was credited with 82, aerial victories—that is, 82 aerial combat encounters resulting in the destruction of the enemy aircraft—claimed in approximately 550 combat missions. The majority of his victories were claimed over the Eastern Front, with 21 claims over the Western Front, including five flying the Messerschmitt Me 262 jet fighter.

Born in Gross-Fahlenwerder, Grünberg served in the Luftwaffe of Nazi Germany. Following flight training, he was posted to Jagdgeschwader 3 "Udet" (JG 3—3rd Fighter Wing) in 1942, operating on the Eastern Front. He claimed his first aerial victory on 19 August 1942. On 9 May 1944, Grünberg was appointed Staffelkapitän (squadron leader) of 5. Staffel (5th squadron) of JG 3 and was awarded the Knight's Cross of the Iron Cross on 9 June 1944. In January 1945, Grünberg was posted to Jagdgeschwader 7 "Nowotny" (JG 7—7th Fighter Wing), the first jet fighter wing where he served as a Staffelkapitän of 1. Staffel. He died on 16 January 1998 in Ellerau.

Military career
Grünberg was born on 8 July 1917 in Gross-Fahlenwerder in the Province of Province of Pomerania as part of the German Empire, present-day Ściechów in western Poland. Following fighter pilot training, he was posted to 5. Staffel (5th squadron) of Jagdgeschwader 3 "Udet" (JG 3—3rd Fighter Wing) with the rank of Unteroffizier (a junior non-commissioned officer) in May 1942. Initially his commanding officer in 5. Staffel was Oberleutnant Harald Moldenhauer, replaced by Oberleutnant Joachim Kirschner on 1 October. The squadron was subordinated to II. Gruppe (2nd group) of JG 3 headed by Hauptmann Kurt Brändle.

Following the Battle of Kalach on 15 August, the German 6th Army attempted to win bridgeheads on the eastern banks of the Don river and advance towards Stalingrad, which then became the Battle of Stalingrad. Grünberg achieved his first victory on 19 August, when he shot down a Soviet Ilyushin DB-3 twin-engine bomber. In December 1942, Grünberg volunteered for the Platzschutzstaffel (airfield defence squadron) of the Pitomnik Airfield. The Staffel, largely made up from volunteers from I. and II. Gruppe of JG 3, was responsible for providing fighter escort to Junkers Ju 52 transport aircraft and Heinkel He 111 bombers shuttling supplies for the encircled German forces fighting in Stalingrad. By the end of 1942, Grünberg had amassed 11 victories. He had bailed out four times during his time in the Soviet Union. 

Grünberg became an "ace-in-a-day" on 5 Juli 1943, the first day of Operation Citadel, the German offensive phase of the Battle of Kursk. That day he was credited with seven aerial victories. On 16 July, it is possible he became a victim of a female fighter pilot Lydia Litvyak. On 1 August 1943, Grünberg claimed his last aerial victory on the Eastern Front when he shot down an Ilyushin Il-2 ground-attack aircraft.

Western Front
Grünberg then flew with 5. Staffel of JG 3 on Defense of the Reich duties based in Germany. On 9 May 1944, Grünberg was appointed Staffelkapitän (squadron leader) of 5. Staffel of JG 3. He replaced Leutnant Leopold Münster who was killed in action the day before. Grünberg was awarded the Knight's Cross of the Iron Cross on 9 June 1944.

Flying the Messerschmitt Me 262

JG 7 "Nowotny" was the first operational jet fighter wing in the world and was named after Walter Nowotny, who was killed in action on 8 November 1944. Nowotny, a fighter pilot credited with 258 aerial victories and recipient of the Knight's Cross of the Iron Cross with Oak Leaves, Swords and Diamonds, had been assessing the Messerschmitt Me 262 jet aircraft under operational conditions. JG 7 "Nowotny" was equipped with the Me 262, an aircraft which was heavily armed and faster than any Allied fighter. General der Jagdflieger (General of the Fighter Force) Adolf Galland hoped that the Me 262 would compensate for the Allies' numerical superiority. On 12 November 1944, the Oberkommando der Luftwaffe (OKL—Air Force High Command) ordered JG 7 "Nowotny" to be equipped with the Me 262. Galland appointed Oberst Johannes Steinhoff as its first Geschwaderkommodore (wing commander).

JG 7 "Nowotny" was initially formed with the Stab (headquarters unit) and III. Gruppe  at Brandenburg-Briest from the remnants of Kommando Nowotny. I. Gruppe was created on 27 November from pilots and personnel from II. Gruppe of JG 3 and placed under the command of Major Theodor Weissenberger. Weissenberger's appointed Staffelkapitäne in I. Gruppe were Oberleutnant Grünberg, Oberleutnant Fritz Stehle, and Oberleutnant Hans Waldmann, commanding 1.–3. Staffel respectively. In March, 1. Staffel was based at Kaltenkirchen. Grünberg claimed his first aerial victory flying the Me 262 on 31 March 1945. That day, the Royal Air Force and the Royal Canadian Air Force attacked Wilhelmshaven, Bremen, and Hamburg. This attack force was intercepted by 20 Me 262 jet fighters from I. and III. Gruppe of JG 7. At approximately 08:15 Grünberg took off with his Staffel of eight Me 262s and was vectored to a point of intercept over the urban area of Hamburg where Grünberg claimed two Avro Lancaster bombers shot down.

On 10 April, the United States Army Air Forces (USAF) Eighth Air Force sent 1,315 heavy bombers against German operations, attacking the airfields at Brandenburg-Briest, Rechlin-Lärz, Oranienburg, Neuruppin, Burg and Parchim. The bombers were escorted by 905 fighter aircraft. The bombers were intercepted by 30 Me 262 jet fighters. In this encounter, Grünberg shot down two Boeing B-17 Flying Fortress bombers. Grünberg claimed his last aerial victory on 19 April. That day, 20 Me 262s from JG 7 and I. Gruppe of Kampfgeschwader 54 (J), the jet fighter equipped Gruppe of the 54th Bomber Wing, intercepted USAAF bombers in the Dresden-Aussig-Pirna area. In the timeframe 12:14 to 12:34, six B-17 bombers of the 3rd Air Division were attacked by Me 262s from JG 7. Five B-17s were shot down, including one by Grünberg. In the second half of April, assumed in the timeframe 17 to 27 April, Grünberg joined Adolf Galland's Jagdverband 44 (JV 44—44th Fighter Detachment).

Summary of career

Aerial victory claims
According to US historian David T. Zabecki, Grünberg was credited with 82 aerial victories. Spick also lists Grünberg with 82 aerial victories claimed in approximately 550 combat missions. This figure includes 61 aerial victories on the Eastern Front, and further 21 victories over the Western Allies, including 14 heavy bombers, among them five flying the Me 262. Obermaier also states that he was credited with 82 aerial victories with 61 on the Eastern Front and 21 over the Western Allies. Additionally, he was credited with destroying 21 trucks, one locomotive and an armoured reconnaissance vehicle. Mathews and Foreman, authors of Luftwaffe Aces — Biographies and Victory Claims, researched the German Federal Archives and found records for 78 aerial victory claims, plus one further unconfirmed claim. This figure includes 61 aerial victories on the Eastern Front and 17 over the Western Allies, including 10 heavy bombers, among them five flying the Me 262.

Victory claims were logged to a map-reference (PQ = Planquadrat), for example "PQ 40793". These sectors were then subdivided into 36 smaller units to give a location area 3 × 4 km in size.

Awards
 Iron Cross (1939) 2nd and 1st class
 Honour Goblet of the Luftwaffe on 9 August 1943 as Feldwebel and pilot
 German Cross in Gold on 31 August 1943 as Feldwebel in the 5./Jagdgeschwader 3
 Knight's Cross of the Iron Cross on 9 June 1944 as Leutnant (war officer) and pilot in the 5./Jagdgeschwader 3 "Udet"

Notes

References

Citations

Bibliography

External links

1917 births
1998 deaths
German World War II flying aces
Luftwaffe pilots
People from Gorzów County
People from the Province of Brandenburg
Recipients of the Gold German Cross
Recipients of the Knight's Cross of the Iron Cross